Saleh Ali al-Sammad (
1 January 1979 – 19 April 2018) was a Yemeni political figure from the Houthi movement who served as the chairman of Yemen's Supreme Political Council and the de facto President of Yemen until his assassination.

On April 23, 2018, Houthi officials announced al-Sammad was killed in a Saudi-led coalition drone airstrike.

Political career 
Saleh Ali al-Sammad was born in Bani Ma'az in Yemen's Sahar District on 1 January 1979.

He was appointed in September 2014 to serve as a political adviser to President Abdrabbuh Mansur Hadi.

Al-Sammad struck a conciliatory posture during and after the 2014–15 coup. In November 2014, after the Houthis withdrew from Yemen's "unity government", he expressed support for most of Hadi's cabinet choices, including Prime Minister Khaled Bahah.

As of February 2015, after the Houthi takeover of the government, he was described as "the senior Houthi leader in Sana'a".

In February 2015, al-Sammad said the Houthis hoped for normal relations with the United States and other countries and suggested that the group was interested in sharing power with other political factions, potentially including members of the deposed House of Representatives in a new, 551-member parliament.

On 6 August 2016, al-Sammad became head of the Supreme Political Council. He was sworn in on 14 August.

On 15 August 2016, the Supreme Revolutionary Committee handed power to the Supreme Political Council.

Death 
On 23 April 2018, Al-Samad was killed by a Saudi-led coalition drone strike, making him the most senior Houthi casualty. The weapon was a LJ-7 or AKD-10 air-to-surface missile, possibly fired from a  Wing Loong II UCAV.

Abdul-Malik al-Houthi, the top leader of the Houthi movement, stated that "the forces of aggression, led by America and Saudi Arabia, bear the legal responsibility for this crime and all its consequences."

See also 
 Samad (UAV)

References

1979 births
2018 deaths
Deaths by airstrike
Houthi members
People from Saada Governorate
Sanaa University alumni
People killed in the Yemeni Civil War (2014–present)
Presidents of Yemen